Torgrim Sørnes (born March 2, 1956, in Moss) is a Norwegian physician, historian and author, who has written extensively on Norwegian social and forensic history.

Early life and education
Sørnes was born in Moss, Østfold, and raised on the island of Jeløy in the Oslofjord. His father is the writer and engineer Tor Sørnes and he has three siblings. He attended Kirkeparken senior high school and later studied medicine at the University of Bergen, subsequently becoming an obstetrician/gynecologist. He currently resides in Lørenskog, outside of Oslo.

Career
He made his publishing debut in 2009 with the book Cruelty: The executed in Norway 1815–1876, which deals in detail with every case of capital punishment in the period 1815–1876, fellow crime author and historian Hans Olav Lahlum called it "a masterpiece". Aftenposten called it a "unique insight into the old norwegian society seen from below".

His second work, No Mercy: The executed in Norway 1783–1814 (2011), which can be regarded as a prequel to his first book, takes an in-depth look on Norwegian judicial history in general and  cases of capital punishment in the period 1783–1814 in particular, again dealing with every case individually and in relation to the society at the time. He puts some perspective on the influence of demography and social inequalities in dealing with both perpetrators and victims. He has been noted for bringing the view of a clinician when regarding the anatomical methodology and the art and technique of the classical executions.

Anna Østmo mystery
In October 2010, Sørnes was called in to investigate when startled construction workers in Åsnes uncovered centuries-old human remains at their building site. Sørnes quickly determined it to be the remains of an 18th-century female, condemned child-murderer Anna Østmo, who was executed for murdering her two infant children in 1784. Trial records indicated that her dying wish was to be interred at the church cemetery; however, this would not be granted until April 2012, 228 years later, at the request of Sørnes.

A similar incident occurred in  
October 2011 in Stavern when workers uncovered another set of mysterious skeletal human remains, which again turned out to be centuries old. This time Sørnes deduced that it either belonged to a murderer executed in 1816, or one executed in 1775. Its precise identity was never confirmed.

Bibliography

 2009: Cruelty: The executed in Norway 1815–1876 
 2011: No Mercy: The executed in Norway 1783–1814 
 2014: Deeds of the dark: The executed in Norway 1772–1782 
 2016: Executioner: Mathias Fliegenring 1685–1729 
 2018: In human form: The executed in Norway 1765–1771 
 2020: The valleys of the shadow of death: The executed in Norway 1759–1764 
 2021: Dr Gisleson and his patients 
 2022: A wilderness of horrors

Reviews
 in Haugesunds Avis (in Norwegian)
 in Aftenposten (in Norwegian)
 in Journal of the Norwegian Medical Association (in Norwegian)
 in Vesterålen Online (in Norwegian)
 in Bokavisen (in Norwegian)
 in Bokelskere (in Norwegian)

References

External links
Official webpage
Torgrim Sørnes at Schibsted Agency

1956 births
Living people
21st-century Norwegian historians
Norwegian crime writers
University of Bergen alumni
People from Moss, Norway
People from Lørenskog
Norwegian obstetricians and gynaecologists